The 20th Central Committee of the Chinese Communist Party (CCP) was elected by the 20th National Congress in October 2022, and will sit until the next National Congress is convened in 2027. It formally succeeded the 19th Central Committee.

The committee is composed of full members and alternate members. A full member has voting rights, while an alternate does not. If a full member is removed from the Central Committee the vacancy is then filled by an alternate member at the next committee plenum – the alternate member who received the most confirmation votes in favor is highest on the order of precedence. To be elected to the Central Committee, a candidate must be a party member for at least five years.

The first plenary session in 2022 was responsible for electing the bodies in which the authority of the Central Committee is invested when it is not in session: the Politburo and the Politburo Standing Committee. It was also responsible for approving the members of the Secretariat, 20th Central Commission for Discipline Inspection and its Standing Committee. The second plenary session in 2023 will nominate candidates for state positions.

Plenums
Under construction

Apparatus
Under construction

Membership

 Ding Xuedong
 Ding Xuexiang
 Wan Lijun
 Xi Jinping
 Ma Xingrui
 Ma Xiaowei
 Wang Ning
 Wang Kai
 Wang Kai
 Wang Yong
 Wang Hao
 Wang Qiang
 Wang Peng
 Wang Yi
 Wang Xiaohong
 Wang Guanghua
 Wang Renhua
 Wang Wenquan
 Wang Wentao
 Wang Yubo
 Wang Zhengpu
 Wang Dongming
 Wang Weizhong
 Wang Zhijun
 Wang Xiubin
 Wang Huning
 Wang Junzheng
 Wang Zhonglin
 Wang Shouwen
 Wang Chunning
 Wang Lixia
 Wang Xiaohui
 Wang Xiangxi
 Wang Qingxian
 Wang Menghui
 Ju Qiansheng
 Mao Weiming
 Yin Li
 Yin Hong
 Bagatur
 Erkin Tuniyaz
 Shi Taifeng
 Ye Jianchun
 Feng Fei
 Qu Qingshan
 Ren Zhenhe
 Zhuang Rongwen
 Liu Ning
 Liu Wei
 Liu Xiaoming
 Liu Faqing
 Liu Qingsong
 Liu Guozhong
 Liu Jinguo
 Liu Jianchao
 Liu Junchen
 Liu Zhenli
 Liu Haixing
 Qi Yu
 Xu Qin
 Xu Kunlin
 Xu Xueqiang
 Sun Jinlong
 Sun Shaocheng
 Yin Hejun
 Yan Jinhai
 Li Yi
 Li Wei
 Li Xi
 Li Qiang
 Li Ganjie
 Li Xiaoxin
 Li Fengbiao
 Li Shulei
 Li Yuchao
 Li Lecheng
 Li Yifei
 Li Shangfu
 Li Guoying
 Li Bingjun
 Li Qiaoming
 Li Xiaohong
 Li Hongzhong
 Yang Cheng
 Yang Zhiliang
 Yang Xuejun
 Xiao Jie
 Xiao Pei
 Wu Hansheng
 Wu Yanan
 Wu Zhenglong
 Wu Xiaojun
 He Weidong
 He Lifeng
 He Hongjun
 Zou Jiayi
 Ying Yong
 Wang Haijiang
 Shen Chunyao
 Shen Xiaoming
 Shen Yueyue
 Huai Jinpeng
 Zhang Gong
 Zhang Jun
 Zhang Lin
 Zhang Youxia
 Zhang Shengmin
 Zhang Yuzhuo
 Zhang Qingwei
 Zhang Hongbing
 Zhang Hongsen
 Zhang Yupu
 Zhang Guoqing
 Lu Hao
 Lu Zhiyuan
 Chen Gang
 Chen Xu
 Chen Yixin
 Chen Xiaojiang
 Chen Wenqing
 Chen Jining
 Chen Min'er
 Nurlan Abilmazhinuly
 Miao Hua
 Lin Wu
 Lin Xiangyang
 Yi Huiman
 Yi Lianhong
 Luo Wen
 Jin Zhuanglong
 Jin Xiangjun
 Zhou Qiang
 Zhou Naixiang
 Zhou Zuyi
 Zheng Shanjie
 Zheng Xincong
 Meng Fanli
 Meng Xiangfeng
 Zhao Long
 Zhao Gang
 Zhao Yide
 Zhao Leji
 Zhao Xiaozhe
 Hao Peng
 Hu Zhongming
 Hu Yuting
 Hu Changsheng
 Hu Heping
 Hu Chunhua
 Hu Henghua
 Zhong Shaojun
 Xin Changxing
 Hou Kai
 Hou Jianguo
 Yu Qingjiang
 Yu Jianhua
 He Rong
 He Junke
 Qin Gang
 Qin Shutong
 Yuan Huazhi
 Yuan Jiajun
 Tie Ning
 Ni Hong
 Ni Yuefeng
 Xu Lin
 Xu Xisheng
 Xu Zhongbo
 Xu Qiling
 Xu Deqing
 Yin Yong
 Gao Xiang
 Gao Zhidan
 Guo Puxiao
 Tang Renjian
 Tang Dengjie
 Huang Ming
 Huang Qiang
 Huang Shouhong
 Huang Kunming
 Huang Jianfa
 Huang Xiaowei
 Gong Zheng
 Chang Dingqiu
 Tuo Zhen
 Liang Yanshun
 Liang Huiling
 Shen Yiqin
 Dong Jun
 Han Jun
 Han Wenxiu
 Jing Junhai
 Cheng Lihua
 Fu Hua
 Tong Jianming
 Xie Chuntao
 Lan Tianli
 Lan Fo'an
 Lou Yangsheng
 Lei Fanpei
 Shen Haixiong
 Cai Qi
 Cai Jianjiang
 Pei Jinjia
 Pan Yue

Alternates
All the names on the list is ranked from top to bottom according to the number of votes.
Ding Xiangqun
Ding Xingnong  
Yu Lijun 
Yu Jihong (female)     
Yu Huiwen (Manchu people)   
Ma Hancheng (Hui people)    
Wang Jian 
Wang Xi 
Wang Liyan  
Wang Yonghong  
Wang Kangping
Wang Tingkai  
Wang Xinwei  
Wang Jiayi 
Wei Tao (Zhuang people)   
Fang Yongxiang 
Fang Hongwei 
Deng Yiwu 
Deng Xiuming  
Shi Yugang (Miao people)    
Shi Zhenglu  
Lu Hong (female)   
Lu Dongliang
Fu Wenhua  
Cong Liang 
Bao Gang (Mongolian people)  
Xing Shanping (female)    
Ji Lin  
Qu Yingpu  
Lü Jun  
Zhu Tianshu  
Zhu Wenxiang  
Zhu Zhisong  
Zhu Guoxian  
Zhu Hexin  
Liu Jun
Liu Jie  
Liu Qiang  
Liu Zhonghua  
Liu Hongjian  
Liu Guiping  
Liu Liehong  
Liu Jingzhen  
Guan Zhi'ou (Manchu people)   
Tang Guangfu  
An Wei  
Nong Shengwen (Zhuang people)
Sun Xiangdong  
Sun Jinming
Sun Meijun (female)     
Ji Bin  
Du Jiangfeng  
Li Yunze  
Li Wentang  
Li Shucai  
Li Shisong (Bai people)    
Li Hongjun  
Li Xianyu (female, Korean people)     
Li Mingjun  
Li Mingqing
Li Jianrong (female)     
Li Rongcan  
Li Dianxun  
Li Ruxin  
Yang Bin (Yi people)    
Yang Jinbai  
Lian Maojun  
Shi Guanghui  
Wu Hao  
Wu Qing  
Wu Qiang (Dong people)
Wu Kongming
Wu Junbao  
Wu Shenghua (Buyi people)
Wu Zhaohui  
Qiu Yong  
He Yaling (female)   
Gu Shu  
Shen Ying (female)      
Shen Danyang  
Zhang Wei  
Zhang Zheng  
Zhang Fengzhong  
Zhang Wenbing
Zhang Anshun  
Zhang Guohua  
Zhang Zhongyang  
Zhang Jinliang  
Zhang Chunlin  
Zhang Rongqiao  
Zhang Chaochao  
Zhang Zhigang  
Chen Jie  
Chen Yong (Manchu people)
Chen Yongqi  
Chen Hongmin  
Chen Jianwen  
Chen Ruifeng
Lin Keqing  
Hang Yihong  
Luo Qiang (Miao people)    
Luo Dongchuan  
Jin Donghan  
Zhou Zhijin  
Zhou Jianguo  
Zheng Xuexuan  
Zhao Dong (Manchu people)   
Hu Wenrong  
Shi Xiaolin (female)     
Jiang Hui
Jiang Guoping  
Hong Qing (Korean people) 
Zuliati Simayi (female, Uygur people)    
Fei Dongbin  
Fei Gaoyun  
Yao Lin  
Yuan Jie  
Yuan Gujie (female)      
Xia Linmao  
Xu Liuping
Ling Huanxin  
Guo Fang (female)      
Guo Yuanqiang  
Guo Ningning (female)        
Guo Yonghong (female)      
Guo Zhuxue  
Zhuge Yujie        
Huang Ru (female, Hui people)          
Huang Xucong
Huang Zhiqiang  
Huang Lusheng  
Cao Shumin (female)    
Gong Qihuang  
Chang Jin  
Cui Yuzhong  
Cui Yonghui  
Kang Yi  
Peng Jiaxue  
Ge Qiaohong (female)     
Dong Weiming  
Han Liming (female)  
Qin Weizhong  
Jing Jianfeng  
Fu Aiguo  
Purpu Tonchup (Tibetan people) 
Zeng Yixin  
Zeng Zanrong  
Wen Gang  
Lan Xiao (Yao people)    
Yu Aihua  
Dou Xiankang  
Cai Yunge  
Cai Lixin (female)  
Cai Xiliang  
Gama Zeden (Tibetan people)  
Liao Lin  
Miao Jianmin  
Li Xiang  
Wei Wenhui  
Tsheringthar (Tibetan people)   
Wang Xudong  
Wang Xiaoyun (female)    
Yang Fasen  
Xiao Chuan  
Yu Jianfeng
Song Zhiyong  
Song Yushui (female)     
Zhang Jing  
Zhou Changkui  
Shi Jintong (Miao people) 
Wang Cheng

Politburo

Standing Committee

All members

See also
 Central committee
 Presidium of the 20th National Congress of the Chinese Communist Party

References

Notes

Citations

Central Committee of the Chinese Communist Party
2022 establishments in China